Simphiwe Gcwele Nomvula Mbatha is a South African politician who has been a Member of the National Assembly for the African National Congress since May 2019.

Parliamentary career
Mbatha is a member of the African National Congress. Prior to the 8 May 2019 general election, Mbatha was placed ninth on the party's regional Gauteng list. After the election, she was nominated to the National Assembly of South Africa. She took office on 22 May 2019. She was given her committee assignments on 27 June 2019.

Committee memberships
Portfolio Committee on Agriculture, Land Reform and Rural Development (Alternate Member)
Portfolio Committee on Environment, Forestry and Fisheries

Personal life
In July 2020, Mbatha tested positive for COVID-19.

References

External links
Ms Simphiwe Gcwele Nomvula Mbatha at Parliament of South Africa

Living people
Year of birth missing (living people)
People from Gauteng
Members of the National Assembly of South Africa
Women members of the National Assembly of South Africa
African National Congress politicians